The 1913 Washington and Lee Generals football team represented Washington and Lee University as a member of the South Atlantic Intercollegiate Athletic Association (SAIAA) during the 1913 college football season. Led by Heman L. Dowd in his first and only year as head coach, the Generals compiled an overall record of 8–1 with a mark of 3–1 in SAIAA play.

Schedule

References

Washington and Lee
Washington and Lee Generals football seasons
Washington and Lee Generals football